Eli Nawi is an Israeli Paralympic rower. He made his Paralympics debut in 2008 where he competed in the Men's single sculls competition. Nawi finished the event with a time of five minutes and 39.11 seconds, winning a bronze medal.

References

External links
 

Living people
Paralympic bronze medalists for Israel
Medalists at the 2008 Summer Paralympics
Year of birth missing (living people)
Paralympic rowers of Israel